Dhalaa  is a town and commune in Oum El Bouaghi Province, Algeria.

Localities  of the commune 
The commune is composed of 21 localities:

References

Communes of Oum El Bouaghi Province